Untasted Honey is the fourth studio album by American country music artist Kathy Mattea. It was released in 1987 on Mercury Records. The album produced Mattea's first Number One hit on the Billboard country charts in its lead-off single "Goin' Gone". Following this song was another Number One hit, "Eighteen Wheels and a Dozen Roses", then "Untold Stories" and "Life as We Knew It", both of which reached #4. "The Battle Hymn of Love" was later released as a single from Mattea's 1990 album A Collection of Hits. Like Walk the Way the Wind Blows before it, this album includes a cut originally found on Nanci Griffith's 1986 album The Last of the True Believers, this time in the track "Goin' Gone". Untasted Honey was certified gold by the RIAA.

Track listing

Personnel

Pat Alger – acoustic guitar
Billy Barnes – design, art direction
Matthew Barnes – design
Craig Bickhardt – acoustic guitar, background vocals
Bruce Bouton – pedal steel guitar
Tim O'Brien – acoustic guitar, mandolin, background vocals
Beth Nielsen Chapman – background vocals
Jerry Douglas – dobro
Ray Flacke – acoustic guitar, electric guitar
Pat Flynn – acoustic guitar
Nick Forster – acoustic guitar, electric guitar
Roy Huskey Jr. – upright bass
Mike Leech – bass guitar
Chris Leuzinger – acoustic guitar, electric guitar
Deb Mahalanobis – design
Kenny Malone – drums, percussion
Kathy Mattea – lead vocals, background vocals
Mark Miller – engineer, mixing
Dave Pomeroy – bass guitar
Denny Purcell – mastering
Allen Reynolds – producer
Cindy Reynolds-Wyatt – harp
David Schaufer – dulcimer
Milton Sledge – drums, percussion
John Thompson – background vocals
Pete Wasner – organ, piano, electric piano
Buck White – piano
Bobby Wood – organ, piano
Bob Wray – bass guitar

Charts

Weekly charts

Year-end charts

Release history

References

Allmusic (see infobox)

Kathy Mattea albums
Mercury Nashville albums
Albums produced by Allen Reynolds
1987 albums